Sunrisers Eastern Cape is a South African professional Twenty20 franchise cricket team that first competed in the inaugural season of SA20 tournament.The team is based in Gqeberha, South Africa, and was formed in 2022. The team's home-ground is the St George's Park Cricket Ground. The team is coached by Adrian Birrell.The franchise is owned by the Indian SUN Group.

Current squad
The franshise's squad for the first season of the competition was:
 Players with international caps are listed in bold

Statistics

Most runs

Most wickets

Administration and support staff

References

External links
Sunrisers section at the SA20 website.

Cricket in South Africa
2022 establishments in South Africa
Sport in Port Elizabeth
Cricket clubs established in 2022
Sports clubs in South Africa
SA20
Sun Group